Owen Joseph Christoffer Norem (May 23, 1902 in Sioux City, Iowa - 1981 in California) was a non-career appointee who served as the American Envoy Extraordinary and Minister Plenipotentiary to Lithuania. He presented his credential on November 26, 1937.  His mission was terminated when Soviet forces occupied Lithuania on June 15, 1940.

Norem earned a B.A. from St. Olaf College in 1923 and attended the University of Minnesota and Luther Theological Seminary.  From 1927 until 1937, he was a pastor.

References

St. Olaf College alumni
People from Sioux City, Iowa
Luther Seminary alumni
University of Minnesota alumni
Ambassadors of the United States to Lithuania
American Protestant ministers and clergy
1902 births
Year of death missing